Murray is a village in Cass County, Nebraska, United States. The population was 463 at the 2010 census.

History
An early variant name was "Fairview". Murray was platted in 1891 when the Missouri Pacific Railroad was extended to that point. The present name is after Rev. George Murray, a pioneer settler.

Geography
Murray is located at  (40.916631, -95.928169).

Demographics

2010 census
As of the census of 2010, there were 463 people, 187 households, and 130 families living in the village. The racial makeup of the village was 94.4% White, 0.2% African American, 0.4% Native American, 0.2% Asian, 1.3% from other races, and 3.5% from two or more races. Hispanic or Latino of any race were 4.1% of the population.

There were 187 households, of which 32.6% had children under the age of 18 living with them, 52.4% were married couples living together, 12.3% had a female householder with no husband present, 4.8% had a male householder with no wife present, and 30.5% were non-families. 26.2% of all households were made up of individuals, and 12.8% had someone living alone who was 65 years of age or older. The average household size was 2.48 and the average family size was 2.98.

The median age in the village was 41.4 years. 24.4% of residents were under the age of 18; 7.1% were between the ages of 18 and 24; 22.2% were from 25 to 44; 28.2% were from 45 to 64; and 17.9% were 65 years of age or older. The gender makeup of the village was 50.1% male and 49.9% female.

2000 census
As of the census of 2000, there were 481 people, 188 households, and 140 families living in the village. The population density was 2,067.1 people per square mile (807.5/km2). There were 197 housing units at an average density of 846.6 per square mile (330.7/km2). The racial makeup of the village was 97.71% White, 1.25% Asian, 0.62% from other races, and 0.42% from two or more races. Hispanic or Latino of any race were 1.66% of the population.

There were 188 households, out of which 31.4% had children under the age of 18 living with them, 66.0% were married couples living together, 6.4% had a female householder with no husband present, and 25.5% were non-families. 21.8% of all households were made up of individuals, and 10.1% had someone living alone who was 65 years of age or older. The average household size was 2.56 and the average family size was 2.98.

In the village, the population was spread out, with 25.8% under the age of 18, 5.8% from 18 to 24, 29.5% from 25 to 44, 26.0% from 45 to 64, and 12.9% who were 65 years of age or older. The median age was 38 years. For every 100 females, there were 97.1 males. For every 100 females age 18 and over, there were 93.0 males.

As of 2000 the median income for a household in the village was $52,386, and the median income for a family was $56,250. Males had a median income of $37,386 versus $21,094 for females. The per capita income for the village was $21,274. About 2.1% of families and 2.6% of the population were below the poverty line, including 3.0% of those under age 18 and 7.5% of those age 65 or over.

See also
 Naomi Institute

References

Villages in Cass County, Nebraska
Villages in Nebraska